Barreh Bu Anjirban (also Romanized as Barreh Bū Anjīrīān) is a village in Nasrabad Rural District (Kermanshah Province), in the Central District of Qasr-e Shirin County, Kermanshah Province, Iran. At the 2006 census, its population was 52, in 10 families. The village is populated by Kurds.

References 

Populated places in Qasr-e Shirin County
Kurdish settlements in Kermanshah Province